The Alfred Tarski Lectures are an annual distinction in mathematical logic and series of lectures held at the University of California, Berkeley. Established in tribute to Alfred Tarski on the fifth anniversary of his death, the award has been given every year since 1989.

Tarski Lecturers 

The list of past Tarski lecturers is maintained by UC Berkeley.

See also

 Gödel Lecture

 Karp Prize

 List of mathematics awards

 List of philosophy awards

 List of logicians

External links 

 Site of the Alfred Tarski Lectures at UC Berkeley Mathematics
 Site of the Alfred Tarski Lectures at UC Berkeley Logic
 List of past Alfred Tarski Lectures

References 

Mathematics awards
Philosophy awards